Andy Lee (born 27 November 1980), also known as Lee Chun Wai, is an English and Hong Kong professional snooker player.

Career
He qualified for the main tour for the 2008–09 season by beating Adam Duffy 6–3 in the 2008 English Pro Ticket Tour Play-offs. In his début season, he reached the last 64 of the Royal London Watches Grand Prix, beating Lewis Roberts 5–2 and Barry Pinches 5–4 before losing 2–5 to Jimmy Michie; in the China Open, Lee beat Matthew Selt and Paul Davies before losing at the same stage to Gerard Greene. Having earned £5,000 in prize money, Lee finished the season ranked 83rd and was relegated from the main tour.

As an amateur, Lee competed in the Players Tour Championship series between 2010 and 2016, without any success. He entered Q-School in 2018 in an attempt to win back a place on the main tour; in Event 1, he lost in the last 32, 0–4 to Thor Chuan Leong. He progressed one round further in Event 2, being eliminated 1–4 by Lu Ning in the last 16. At the final event, he beat Kuldesh Johal 4–2 in the quarter-finals to regain his professional status after a hiatus of nine years.

Lee lost the Last 64 2018 World Open 1–5 to Neil Robertson and lost the Last 128 2018 Paul Hunter Classic 3–4 to English Amateur player Reggie Edwards.

Personal life
Lee was born in the United Kingdom, to parents who were emigrated from Hong Kong to the UK in 1975. His father was a Hong Kong policeman. He was educated at John Cleveland College and De Montfort University.

Performance and rankings timeline

Career titles

Amateur snooker
IBSF World Team Snooker Championships - 2014
Hong Kong 6-Red Open Championship - 2011, 2013, 2017
Hong Kong Snooker Open Championship -  2012 (Event 2), 2013 (Event 1, Event 3), 2016 (Event 2), 2017 (Event 2), 2018 (Event 1)

References

External links 

Andy Lee at worldsnooker.com

1980 births
Living people
English snooker players
People from Hinckley
Sportspeople from Leicestershire
Hong Kong snooker players
English people of Hong Kong descent
Alumni of De Montfort University